Me is the upcoming debut single album by South Korean singer and Blackpink member Jisoo. It is scheduled to release on March 31, 2023 through YG Entertainment and Interscope Records. The single album was released for pre-order on March 5. "Flower" is set to be released as the lead single on the same day the album releases.

Background

Following the release of bandmates Jennie's solo single "Solo" (2018), Rosé's solo single album R (2021), and Lisa's solo single album Lalisa (2021), attention turned towards Jisoo as the final member of Blackpink to debut as a soloist. During an interview with Rolling Stone the singer shared that she still felt "not sure" about pursing a music career outside of the group and the direction it would go in. On January 2, 2023, YG Entertainment confirmed that Jisoo was in the process of recording music for her single album and had completed filming the album's jacket photo shoots. On February 21, her label revealed that filming for her music video was underway in a top-secret location overseas, with the highest production budget they have ever invested into a Blackpink music video.

Release and promotion
On March 5, teasers were uploaded to Blackpink’s social media accounts, confirming that Jisoo's solo project would be released on March 31, 2023. The same day, the single album was made available for pre-order in two standard versions alongside Kit and purple vinyl versions. Jisoo directly participated in the design to "increase the value of the collection". On March 8, the album's title was announced to be Me and the cover art was revealed in a teaser poster featuring a close-up of Jisoo in floral accessories against a green background. A second teaser poster was released on March 12 depicting Jisoo in a white ruffled dress against a black background. On March 15, Jisoo unveiled the first visual teaser for the album, in which she wields a giant poppy while draped in an ensemble of black-and-white striped fur. On March 19, the name of the album's lead single was announced to be "Flower".

Aesthetics
Jisoo used bold red, black-and-white colors with floral accents in her social media posts and clothing during promotion of Me. On March 15, the singer released the first visual film for the single album. In it, Jisoo is seen wearing a "luxe" zebra print outfit while surrounded by "striking" red flowers, accompanied by traditional-sounding instrumentals.

Commercial performance
Me surpassed 510,000 pre-orders in two days and 840,000 pre-orders in a week. In just two weeks, the single album surpassed 950,000 pre-orders, the highest figure ever by a K-pop female solo artist.

Release history

References

2023 debut albums
Single albums
YG Entertainment albums